Aida Bakhos (born 21 March 1986) is a Lebanese basketball forward player. She joined the Lebanon women's national basketball team in 2017, and played for the Homenetmen Antelias club in Beirut. She attended Lamar University until 2008.

Career
Bakhos participated in club competitions in the 2017–18 season with Al Riyadi club and in the 2018–19 season with SG Bergische Löwen club in Germany.

With the national team, she participated in the 11, 17, and 21 seasons.
At the division B of the 2017 FIBA Women's Asia Cup Bakhos represented Lebanon and her stats in 6 games at that event were: 6.7ppg, 4.7rpg, 1.3apg, FGP: 29.3%, 3PT: 25.0%, FT: 65.0%. Lebanon finished 2nd in that tournament.

Achievements
Aida received the Eurobasket.com Mediterranean Cup All-Defensive Team award in 2018. Bakhos has won over 10 League and Cup championships over her career (Lebanese Cup 4x, Lebanese League Champions 4x, WABA Cup Winner, Mediterranean Cup Winner).

References

Basketball in Lebanon
Lebanese women's basketball players
1986 births
Living people

External links
SG Bergische Löwen club